Nicholas Taylor (born 20 March 1996) is an English first-class cricketer and mathematician.

Taylor was born at Huntingdon in March 1996. He was educated at The Perse School, before going up to St Catherine's College, Oxford to study mathematics. While studying at Oxford, he made a single appearance in first-class cricket for Oxford University against Cambridge University in The University Match at Cambridge in 2017. From Oxford, Taylor went on to Clare College at the University of Cambridge to study for a doctorate in plant sciences. While at Cambridge, Taylor played in the 2019 University Match for Cambridge, scoring 59 runs in the Cambridge second innings, having been dismissed without scoring by Toby Pettman. He was chosen to captain Cambridge for the 2020 season, which was disrupted due to the COVID-19 pandemic in England, but did captain the university in its final Varsity Match with first-class status.

References

External links

1996 births
Living people
People from Huntingdon
People educated at The Perse School
Alumni of St Catherine's College, Oxford
English cricketers
Oxford University cricketers
Alumni of Clare College, Cambridge
Cambridge University cricketers